The Yanji People's Stadium (Simplified Chinese: 延吉人民体育场) was a multi-use stadium in Yanji, China with a capacity of 30,000 people. It is used mostly for football matches. It was demolished in 2013 to make way for a new stadium with the same name.
It was the home stadium of Yanbian Changbaishan.

Footnotes

Sports venues in Jilin
Defunct sports venues in China
Buildings and structures in Yanbian
Sport in Yanbian
Demolished buildings and structures in China
Sports venues demolished in 2013